Mehrabad-e Bala may refer to:
 Mehrabad-e Bala, Fars
 Mehrabad-e Bala, Yazd